Journal of Physics is a peer reviewed scientific journal series; it consists of the following journals
 Journal of Physics A: Mathematical and Theoretical
 Journal of Physics B: Atomic, Molecular and Optical Physics
 Journal of Physics C: Solid State Physics (merged with Journal of Physics F)
 Journal of Physics D: Applied Physics
 Journal of Physics E: Scientific Instruments (renamed as Measurement Science and Technology)
 Journal of Physics F: Metal Physics (merged with Journal of Physics C)
 Journal of Physics G: Nuclear and Particle Physics
 Journal of Physics Communications
 Journal of Physics: Complexity
 Journal of Physics: Condensed Matter (merger of Journal of Physics C: Solid State Physics and Journal of Physics F: Metal Physics)
 Journal of Physics: Conference Series
 Journal of Physics: Energy
 Journal of Physics: Materials
 Journal of Physics: Photonics

See also
Measurement Science and Technology#History

External links
IOP Journals § J

IOP Publishing academic journals
Academic journal series